Leptolejeunea tridentata is a species of liverworts in the family Lejeuneaceae. It is endemic to Colombia.  Its natural habitat is subtropical or tropical moist lowland forests. It is threatened by habitat loss.

Sources

Lejeuneaceae
Endemic flora of Colombia
Critically endangered plants
Taxonomy articles created by Polbot